The Titiwangsa Forest Complex runs along the Titiwangsa Mountains (Banjaran Titiwangsa) and forms part of the Central Forest Spine of Peninsular Malaysia.

Patches and Roads 
The Titiwangsa Forest Complex comprises the following patches which are divided by roads running from East to West across the range:

 Greater Belum Forest Patch

Lebuhraya Timur–Barat (Malaysia Federal Route 4)

 Greater Gunung Korbu Forest Patch

Lebuhraya Timur–Barat Kedua (Malaysia Federal Route 185)

 Greater Cameron Highlands Forest Patch

Jalan Kuala Kubu Bharu–Raub (Malaysia Federal Route 55)

 Greater Fraser's Hill Forest Patch

Kuala Lumpur–Karak Expressway (Malaysia Federal Route 2, 68, E8)

 Greater Gunung Nuang Forest Patch

Malaysia Federal Route 86 

 Greater Berembun Forest Patch

Malaysia Federal Route 51

 Greater Angsi Forest Patch

References 
National Physical Plan.  2005. Department of Town and Country Planning, Peninsular Malaysia.

Geography of Malaysia
Forests of Malaysia
Titiwangsa Mountains